A list of films produced by the Bollywood film industry based in Mumbai in 1947:

Highest-grossing films
The nine highest-grossing films at the Indian Box Office in 1947:

A-B

C-D

E-I

J-L

M

N-R

S-Z

References

External links

1947
Bollywood
Films, Bollywood